The Izhora Plateau is an elevated landform on Ordovician limestone bedrock in the southwestern part of Leningrad Oblast, between the Gulf of Finland in the north and the Luga River in the south. Its northern edge is formed by the erosional cliff known as the Baltic-Ladoga Klint. The highest part of the plateau is the Orekhovaya hill of Duderhof Heights at 176 m, situated in its extreme northeastern part. The plateau is mostly covered by agricultural lands. It used to be the heartland of the historical region known as Ingria.

Landforms of Leningrad Oblast
Ingria
Plateaus of Russia